FX is a Greek pay television network, launched by the Fox Networks Group, which launched on 31 December 2009. The channel is broadcasting in Cyprus too, with the same schedule to Greece.

The program includes sci-fi series such as The X-Files and Battlestar Galactica, reality shows such as The Amazing Race animation such as The Simpsons and Family Guy, other series such as Law & Order and The Walking Dead, with new episodes for the first time in Greece and also new recent series such as Terra Nova and The Killing for the first time in Greece.

On October 1st, 2012 FX has been relaunched as Fox under a brand new programming grid. Most of the following series, are broadcasting from Fox. In March 15th, 2023, The Walt Disney Company announced that Fox and Fox Life would reuse the FX brand due to the international Star name used by Disney being already used by the unrelated Star Channel.

Programmes
American Horror Story
Around the World for Free
Battlestar Galactica (miniseries)
Battlestar Galactica (series)
Bob's Burgers
Bridget Marquardt
Call Me Fitz
Camelot
Caprica
Crash
Criminal Minds
Criminal Minds: Suspect Behavior
Day Break
Detroit 1-8-7
Dhani Tackles the Globe
Dinner: Impossible
Dollhouse
Episodes
Falling Skies
Family Guy
FlashForward
Happy Town
How I Met Your Mother
It's Always Sunny in Philadelphia
Jesse James Is a Dead Man
Law & Order
Legend of the Seeker
Life on Mars
Lights Out
Line of Fire
Living in Your Car
Long Way Round
Lost
Manswers
Neighbors from Hell
No Ordinary Family
Persons Unknown
Shaq Vs.
Sons of Anarchy
Stargate Universe
Terra Nova
Terriers
The Amazing Race
The Buried Life
The Chicago Code
The Cleveland Show
The Glades
The Goode Family
The Good Guys
The Hour
The Killing
The League
The Life & Times of Tim
The Simpsons
The Walking Dead
The X-Files
Tiempo final
Touch
Traffic Light
White Collar

External links
FX Greece official site

Television channels and stations established in 2009
Greek-language television stations
FX Networks